Aliiroseovarius crassostreae is a Gram-negative and aerobic bacterium from the genus of Aliiroseovarius. Aliiroseovarius crassostreae can cause the juvenile oyster disease in oysters.

References

External links
Type strain of Aliiroseovarius crassostreae at BacDive -  the Bacterial Diversity Metadatabase

Further reading 
 

Rhodobacteraceae
Bacteria described in 2005